Pechora Radar Station is an early warning radar near Pechora in the Komi Republic, northern Russia. It is a key part of the Russian early warning system against missile attack and was built by the Soviet Union, becoming operational in 1984. It is run by the Russian Aerospace Defence Forces.

Daryal radar overview

The system is a VHF system operating at a wavelength of 1.5 to 2 meters (150 to 200 MHz).

Originally, at least seven Daryal facilities were planned, however, only the first two facilities completed, Pechora and Gabala, were ever operational. Two Daryal-U type were to be built at sites in Balkhash and Mishelevka, Irkutsk; neither were completed. The US Clinton administration offered financial assistance in completing the Mishelevka facility in exchange for amending the ABM treaty to allow US deployment of a national missile defense system. Russia rejected this proposal and in 2002 the US unilaterally withdrew from the ABM treaty.

Two Daryal-UM systems were to be constructed in Skrunda, Latvia and Mukachevo, Ukraine. The Mukachevo one in Ukraine was never completed after the fall of the Soviet Union and the Skrunda facility was turned over to Latvia to be demolished. The Yeniseysk (Krasnoyarsk) Daryal-U site caused concern in the west over compliance with the Anti-Ballistic Missile Treaty during its construction in the 1980s. Following years of negotiations, in September 1989 the Soviets admitted it was a violation of the treaty, construction ceased and the facility was eventually dismantled.

References

Russian Space Forces
Russian and Soviet military radars
Military installations of Russia
Military installations of the Soviet Union